Just Visiting is a two-part 2002 extended play series by Australian rock group, Cog. Besides vocals, it was recorded in the late 1990s. Guitar and drums were recorded at Stage Door Rehearsal Studio, in Alexandria, while bass guitar was recorded by drummer Lucius Borich, at his home on a TASCAM 8-track portastudio, before Luke Gower joined the band on bass guitar. These tracks served as demonstration recordings that had them booked for performance, and eventually signed to booking agent TPA, through Owen Orford. Frustrated at the lack of label interest, Orford, despite his lack of experience with record labels started his own to release the Just Visiting EPs, on Little Samurai Records.

Just Visiting Part 1 was issued on 21 January 2002 on the MGM Distribution label, which peaked at No. 14 on the ARIA Heavy Rock & Metal Singles Chart. While Just Visiting Part 2 appeared on 1 October in that year and reached No. 4 on the same component chart. On 18 August 2008 both parts of the series were released as a single album, remastered by Borich, as Just Visiting. It contained all the tracks from both EPs, with a rearranged track listing and longer versions of "Moshiach", "Bondi", and "Paris, Texas" in place of the ones released on the EP.

Track listing

Part One
 "Moshiach" - 5:33
 "Bondi" - 3:33
 "1010011010" - 5:55
 "Moo" - 4:55
 "Holes" - 4:55

Part Two
 "Paris, Texas" - 4:18
 "Stretch" - 5:58
 "The Truth and Other Lies" - 5:13
 "Pseudo" - 5:22
 "Just Visiting" - 8:18

Re-release
 "Bondi" - 4:59
 "100011010" - 6:00
 "Pseudo" - 5:18
 "Moo" - 4:59
 "Stretch" - 5:58
 "The Truth and Other Lies" - 5:24
 "Holes" - 4:56
 "Moshiach" - 6:39
 "Paris, Texas" - 6:16
 "Just Visiting" - 8:19

Personnel

Cog
 Flynn Gower - guitar & vocals
 Lucius Borich - drums, backings & bits
 Luke Gower - bottom end & backings

Players
 Carla Werner - vocals on "The Truth and Other Lies"
 Flynn Gower - guitar, vocals
 Lucius Borich - drums, bass guitar, samples, backing vocals
 Produced by Cog
 Recorded by Cog, except vocals, recorded by Hamish Adam
 Mixed by "Zak" and Cog
 Mastered by Marsen Murad & Michael Macken

Charts

References 

2002 EPs
EP series
Cog (band) EPs